Bangriposi railway station is a railway station on the South Eastern Railway network in the state of Odisha, India. It serves Bangriposi village. Its code is BGY. It is a Terminus type station & has two platforms. Passenger, Express and Superfast trains halt at Bangriposi railway station.

Major trains
 Bangriposi–Bhubaneswar Superfast Express
Bangriposi- Balasore Passenger Train

See also
 Mayurbhanj district

References

Railway stations in Mayurbhanj district
Kharagpur railway division